Megalonema is a genus of long-whiskered catfishes native to South America.

Species
There are currently eight recognized species in this genus:
 Megalonema amaxanthum Lundberg & Dahdul, 2008
 Megalonema argentinum (MacDonagh, 1938)
 Megalonema orixanthum Lundberg & Dahdul, 2008
 Megalonema pauciradiatum Eigenmann, 1919
 Megalonema platanum (Günther, 1880)
 Megalonema platycephalum Eigenmann, 1912
 Megalonema psammium Schultz, 1944
 Megalonema xanthum Eigenmann, 1912

References

Pimelodidae
Fish of South America
Catfish genera
Taxa named by Carl H. Eigenmann
Freshwater fish genera